Jean-Baptiste Isabey (11 April 1767 – 18 April 1855) was a French painter born at Nancy.

He was a successful artist, both under the First Empire and to the diplomats of the Congress of Vienna.

Life
At the age of nineteen, after some lessons from Dumont, miniature painter to Marie Antoinette, he became a pupil of Jacques-Louis David. Employed at Versailles on portraits of the dukes of Angoulême and Berry, he was given a commission by the queen, which opens the long list of those he received from successive French rulers until his death in 1855.

Patronized by Josephine and Napoleon Bonaparte, he arranged the ceremonies of their coronation and prepared drawings for the publication intended as its official commemoration, a work for which he was paid by Louis XVIII, whose portrait (engraved by Debucourt) he executed in 1814. Although Isabey did homage to Napoleon on his return from Elba, he continued to enjoy the favour of the Restoration, and took part in arrangements for the coronation of Charles X.

The July Monarchy conferred on him an important post in connection with the royal collections, and Napoleon III granted him a pension, and the cross of commander of the Legion of Honor. Review of Troops by the First Consul was one of his most important compositions, and Isabey's Boat – a charming drawing of himself and family-produced at a time when he was much occupied with lithography – had an immense success at the Salon of 1820 (engraved, Landon, Annales, i. 125). His portrait of Napoleon at Malmaison is held to be the best ever executed, and even his tiny head of the king of Rome, painted for a breast-pin, is distinguished by a decision and breadth that show the hand of a master.

A biography of Isabey was published by Edmond Taigny in 1859, and Charles Lenormant's article, written for Michaud's Biog. Univ., is founded on facts furnished by Isabey's family.

His son, Eugène, also became a well known painter.

References

Sources

Basily-Callimaki, Eva de, Mme, J.B. Isabey: sa vie, son temps, 1767-1855: Suivi du Catalogue de l'oeuvre gravee par et d'apres Isabey

External links
 

18th-century French painters
French male painters
19th-century French painters
French portrait painters
Commandeurs of the Légion d'honneur
1767 births
1855 deaths
Burials at Père Lachaise Cemetery
Pupils of Jacques-Louis David
18th-century French male artists